Společnost s ručením omezeným (lit. ‘company with limited liability’) is the Czech and Slovak legal structure for a private limited company (as it is known in the United Kingdom) or a LLC (as it is known in the United States). The commercial name of a limited liability company must include the designation “společnost s ručením omezeným” (Czech) or “spoločnosť s ručením obmedzeným” (Slovak), (e.g. “limited liability company”), or in abbreviated forms, : “spol. s r. o.” or “s. r. o.”. Foreign investors have no restrictions on setting up a limited liability company in the Czech Republic.

See also 
 Compare to Akciová společnost (a. s.)
 in Slovakia Spoločnosť s ručením obmedzeným

References 

Legal entities
Types of business entity
Czech Republic business terminology